The Mise-en-scène Short Film Festival (MSFF) is a Korean short film festival, intended to support upcoming young filmmakers. Since its launch in 2002, it is held every June in Seoul, South Korea.

Official Program Sections 
The Mise-en-scène Short Film Festival is organised into various sections:

Opening Film: Moving Self-Portrait contains video clips shot by the entrants in the Competition in order to introduce themselves. 
Competition: The films are grouped into five genres.
A City of Sadness - Comments on Society
A Short Film About Love - Focus on Relationship
The King of Comedy - From Chaplin to Steven Chow
The Extreme Nightmare - World of Horror & Fantasy
The 40000 Blows - Action & Thriller on Mean Streets
Invitation Programs for Domestic Films
Awarded Films from last year

Awards

Grand prize

Best Film in A City of Sadness

Best Film in A Short Film About Love

Best Film in The King of Comedy

Best Film in The Extreme Nightmare

Best Film in The 40000 Blows

Jury's Special Award

Jury's Special Award for the Actor

Mise-en-scène Award

Audience Award

Ollehtv Audience Award

Other Awards

References

External links 
 

Awards established in 2002
Film festivals established in 2002
2002 establishments in South Korea
Annual events in South Korea
Film festivals in Seoul
Short film festivals
Summer events in South Korea